Victoria General Hospital (VGH) is an acute care facility located in View Royal, British Columbia, Canada, a western suburb of Victoria. VGH provides emergency, general surgery and medical treatment services. It is one of two acute-care hospitals on southern Vancouver Island, along with the Royal Jubilee Hospital. VGH is the only one of the two hospitals which provides maternity services.

The facility has 344 Acute Care beds, 30 Neuro-Rehabilitation beds and 40 Geriatric Ward beds. It is also a teaching hospital for UBC's Department of Orthopaedic Surgery.

History
The current hospital was constructed in 1983. It was known as Victoria General Hospital North until Victoria General Hospital South (in downtown Victoria) was closed a year later. VGH South was known before 1983 as Victoria General Hospital and before that as St. Joseph's Hospital. St. Joseph's Hospital was founded in 1875 and taken over from the Roman Catholic Diocese of Victoria by the provincial government in 1972.

Philanthropy 
Victoria General Hospital is one of three hospitals supported by the Victoria Hospitals Foundation, which also provides financial support to the Royal Jubilee Hospital and the Gorge Road Hospital, both in Victoria.

References

External links
 Victoria General Hospital, Victoria BC
 Canhealth.com
 Victoria Hospitals Foundation
 Victoria General Hospital profile at Island Health

Buildings and structures in Victoria, British Columbia
Hospitals in British Columbia
Hospital buildings completed in 1983
Hospitals established in 1876
Heliports in Canada
Certified airports in British Columbia
1876 establishments in British Columbia